Goldring may refer to:

 Goldring (surname), a surname
 USS Goldring (SS-360), a Balao-class submarine
 The Gold Ring; A group (ring) of conspirators who manipulated the U.S. gold market on September 24, 1869, aka Black Friday
 Mount Goldring, Antarctica
 Goldring or gold-ring, a former common name for the white crappie (Pomoxis annularis)
 Goldring (audio company), an audio equipment manufacturing company
 Goldring, a former name for lands near Rosemont in Helenton Loch, Symington, South Ayrshire, Scotland
 Goldring Centre for High Performance Sport, at the University of Toronto in Ontario, Canada

See also
 Gold ring (disambiguation)
 Goldring danio, Danio tinwini
 Golden Ring (disambiguation)
 Goldring surgeonfish, Ctenochaetus strigosus